The canton of Deuil-la-Barre is an administrative division of the Val-d'Oise department, Île-de-France region, northern France. Its borders were modified at the French canton reorganisation which came into effect in March 2015. Its seat is in Deuil-la-Barre.

It consists of the following communes:
Deuil-la-Barre
Groslay
Montmagny
Saint-Brice-sous-Forêt

References

Cantons of Val-d'Oise